"Episode 2" is the second episode of the British miniseries The Casual Vacancy based on the novel of the same title by J. K. Rowling.

Synopsis

The parish council election approaches and Pagford is on tenterhooks awaiting the next post from 'the Ghost of Barry Fairbrother'. Who is the Ghost, and what will they say? Is anyone in the village safe from humiliation? As tensions rise, the finger of suspicion points in many directions.

Reception
The episode received mixed-to-positive reviews from critics. Cameron K McEwan of Digital Spy gave the episode a mixed review. Despite this, he praised the cast, in particular Abigail Lawrie, Rory Kinnear and Rufus Jones

Ceri Radford of The Telegraph gave the episode 4 out of 5 stars, despite some reservations about the digressions, saying:

References

External links
 

2015 British television episodes
The Casual Vacancy (miniseries) episodes